is a former CEO and president of 7-Eleven. Taking over after the resignation of James W. Keyes, Suzuki had been the temporary successor to Keyes while the search for a replacement CEO and president continued. Suzuki has been a businessman since the early 1970s, during which he brought the 7-Eleven franchise to Japan, and was the acting chairperson before his promotion to CEO and president. Suzuki resigned in April 2016 following a failed management reshuffle. He had served in this role since November 5, 2005.

References

Further reading
 Bloomberg Businessweek Profile

Japanese chief executives
Living people
Year of birth missing (living people)